Momo, sometimes stylised as "MOMO" (born 1974, San Francisco), is an American artist. Originally from San Francisco, he is known for his post-graffiti murals and studio painting. Momo began his experimental outdoor work in the late 90s, working with homemade tools in public spaces. Since 2009 he has been expanding his focus to include a substantial studio practice. He is currently based in New Orleans, Louisiana.

Notable mural commissions include Facebook, Pepsi, the NFL, the World Trade Center, John Hancock Tower, Art Production Fund NY, European Capital of Culture, the NYC DOT, and Yohji Yamamoto's Y-3. Self organized walls in Jamaica, Sicily, and Arizona (2013, 2016, 2018), painted at the artists expense, have been important in demonstrating innovative techniques for a general audience free of the usual commercial concerns.

In 2016 Maya Hayuk, MOMO, Swoon, and Faile inaugurated the new Millennium Iconoclast Museum of Art in Brussels, with installations on five floors. Solo shows the following year were held at Delimbo Gallery in Sevilla and Alice Gallery in Belgium, as well as an experimental group show with Mark Flood, Revok, and Paul Kremer at Library Street Collective in Detroit. MOMO is a long-time collaborator with fellow artist Eltono.

Mural Commissions (selection) 

 Ogden Museum of Southern Art, Louisiana 2019
 Yuma Arts Center, Yuma, Arizona 2018
 Home of the Arts, Gold Coast, Australia 2018 
Facebook, New York 2017
 Facebook Headquarters, California 2017
 Mercedes House, NYC 2017
 Art Production Fund, NYC 2015
 Hudson River Trading Headquarters - 4 World Trade Center, NYC 2017
 Miami Dolphins Stadium, 2016
 Philadelphia Mural Arts, 2016
 Ace Hotel Palm Springs, California 2015
 John Hancock Tower, Boston 2015
 Wynwood Walls (Art Basel), Miami 2012
 Bien Urbain Besançon, France 2012, 2013
 Fame Grottaglie, Italy 2010, 2011, 2012
 Open Walls Baltimore Baltimore, Maryland 2012
 Incubate Tilburg, Holland 2011
 Outomatic Leuven, Belgium 2011
 Nova Contemporary Culture Rio de Janeiro, Brazil 2011
 Crono Festival Lisbon, Portugal 2011

Exhibitions (selection) 

 Machine Show (group) Library Street Collective, Detroit, Michigan 2017
 Wilderness, Delimbo Gallery, Seville, Spain 2017
 Best Picture, Alice Gallery, Brussels, Belgium 2017 
 City Lights (group), MIMA Museum, Brussels, Belgium 2016
 Darmon 2, Studio Cromie, Grottaglie, Italy, 2013
 There Are No Wheels in Nature, Winterlong Gallery, Niort, France 2014
 Just Before Brazil (Group) Alice Gallery, Brussels 2014
 Butt Joints, May Gallery and Residency, New Orleans, Louisiana 2013
 Hecho en Oaxaca (Group), Museo de Arte Contemporáneo de Oaxaca, Mexico, 2013
 Darmon, Studio Cromie, Grottaglie, Italy, 2013
 Artscapes (group), Scion Installation Space, Los Angeles 2010
 Nova, Museu da Imagem e do Som, São Paulo, Brazil 2010
 Post-Graffiti, Geometry, and Abstraction (Group), Fundación Caixa Galicia LaCoruna, Spain 2010
 Y-3 F/W 2009, NY Fashion Week Show, (Runway and Clothing), Pier 40 New York 2009
 PLAF (with Eltono), Anonymous Gallery, New York NY 2008
 MMMB ( with Melissa Brown), Espeis Archetype Gallery, Williamsburg NY 2008
 11 Spring Street (Group), New York NY 2006

References

Further reading
Interview with Ekosystem 2009
 Interview with Subaquatica 2008
 Interview with Paper Monster 2008
 Interview with Eves
 Interview with Design Assembly
Eltono

External links
 Official website: "MOMO SHOW PALACE"

Living people
Pseudonymous artists
1974 births
Artists from San Francisco